Finland's language strife was a major conflict in mid-19th century Finland. Both the Swedish and Finnish languages were commonly used in Finland at the time, associated with descendants of Swedish colonisation and leading to class tensions among the speakers of the different languages. It became acute in the mid-19th century. The competition was considered to have officially ended when Finnish gained official language status in 1923 and became equal to the Swedish language.

Background 

Finland had once been under Swedish rule (Sweden-Finland). Swedish (with some Latin) was the language of administration and education in the Swedish Realm. Swedish was therefore the most-used language of administration and higher education among the Finns. To gain higher education, one had to learn Swedish, and Finnish was considered by the upper classes to be a "language of peasants". Immigration of Swedish peasants to Finland's coastal regions also boosted the status of Swedish by sheer number of speakers. Although Mikael Agricola had started written Finnish with Abckiria in the 1500s, and a Finnish translation of the Civil Code of 1734 was published in 1759 (Ruotzin waldacunnan laki), it had no official status as a legal publication since the official language of administration was Swedish.

As a result of the Finnish War, Sweden ceded Finland to Russia in 1809. Finland became the autonomous Grand Duchy of Finland within the Russian Empire. Under Russian rule, the laws of the Sweden–Finland era remained largely unchanged, and Swedish continued to be used in administration.

The language strife became more acute in the second half of the 19th century. Johan Vilhelm Snellman, a Swede who wished to increase education in Finland, became a chief initiator of conflict in the 1850s due to his concern about the changing language use among the educated classes, many of whom were using Russian or Finnish. He wrote to Zachris Topelius in 1860: "My view is this: Whether Russian or Finnish will win, only God knows. I dare not hope for anything. But that Swedish will lose - that I do know." Elias Lönnrot compiled the first Finnish-Swedish dictionary (Finsk-Svenskt lexikon), completing it in 1880.

Nationalism and the question of language 

The rise of Fennomanic Finnish nationalism in the 19th century eventually led to the revived predominance of Finnish use in the country. A significant contribution to the Finnish national awakening from the mid-19th century onward came from the members of the mostly Swedish-speaking upper classes deliberately choosing to promote Finnish culture and language. Snellman was himself an ethnic Swede and was later ennobled.  These Finnish Swedes, known as the Fennomans, Fennicized their family names, learned Finnish, and made a point of using Finnish both in public and at home. However, another group of the Swedish-speaking population, the Svecomans, did not wish to abandon Swedish and opposed the Fennoman ideology and Fennoman-inspired reforms.

In 1863 Alexander II (AsK 26/1863) ruled that Finnish had an official language status comparable to that of Swedish; it could thereafter be used in an official capacity in legal and state office matters. Within a generation, the Finnish language use gained predominance in the government and the society of Finland. 

During the Russification of Finland, Tsar Nicholas II attempted to change the official language to Russian (Language Manifesto of 1900), but Russification was halted by the general strike of 1905.

After independence 

After Finland gained independence in 1917, its relations with Sweden unexpectedly became strained in connection with the Finnish Civil War and the Åland crisis. These events aggravated the language dispute, and the controversy over Swedish and Finnish became a prominent feature of domestic politics during the 1920s and 1930s.

In the newly independent Finnish constitution of 1919, Finnish and Swedish were given equal status as national languages. The language strife thereafter centered on this and on the role of Swedish in universities, particularly regarding the number of professors who spoke and wrote in Swedish in their teaching. In the interwar period, the University of Helsinki was the scene of conflict between those who wanted to advance the use of Finnish and those who wished to maintain the use of Swedish. Geographer Väinö Tanner was one of the most vocal defenders of Swedish. A campaign initiated by the Swedish People's Party of Finland collected 153,914 signatures in defense of Swedish in a petition that was presented  to the parliament and government in October 1934. The conflict at the university generated an international reaction when academics from Denmark, Sweden, Norway, and Iceland sent letters to the diplomatic representatives of Finland in their respective countries warning that diminishing the role of Swedish at the university would result in a weakening of Nordic unity.

The government issued a language decree on 1 January 1923 making Finnish and Swedish equal in status.
 
During the resettlement of more than 420,000 Karelian refugees after the Winter War against the Soviet Union (1939–1940), the Swedish-speaking minority feared that the new Finnish-speaking settlers would change the linguistic balance of their neighborhoods. Since the late 20th century, there has been discussion of whether the policy of mandatory Swedish classes in schools should continue.

See also 

 Language revival
 Language policy

References

Further reading 
 
 Hult, F.M., & Pietikäinen, S. (2014). "Shaping discourses of multilingualism through a language ideological debate: The case of Swedish in Finland", Journal of Language and Politics, 13, 1-20.

Linguistic rights
Finland Swedish
Language strife
Finnish nationalism
Finnish language
Linguistic controversies